The 2020 IHF Women's Junior World Championship was the 22nd edition of the IHF Women's Junior World Championship, that was supposed to be held in Bucharest and Brașov, Romania. Originally scheduled for 1 to 13 July 2020, the tournament was rescheduled to 2 to 13 December 2020, due to the COVID-19 pandemic.

On 22 February 2021, the tournament was cancelled.

Qualification

 Tournament won by New Caledonia who are ineligible for World Championship. Spot taken by second place Australia.

Venues
Matches will be played in Brașov, and Bucharest

 Polyvalent Hall
 Sala Sporturilor Dumitru Popescu Colibași

References

2020 Women's Junior World Handball Championship
Women's Junior World Handball Championship
2020
Sport in Brașov
Women's handball in Romania
Women's Junior World Handball Championship
Handball